James Carrington may refer to:
 James C. Carrington, plant biologist
 James M. Carrington (1904–1995), politician in the Missouri House of Representatives
 Jim Carrington, educationalist and writer of children's literature